All Saints' Church, Nottingham, is an Anglican church in Nottingham, England.

The church is Grade II listed by the Department for Digital, Culture, Media and Sport as it is a building of special architectural or historic interest.

Background
It was formerly the Parish Church of All Saints', Nottingham, and then became one of the two churches of the parish of Nottingham, St. Peter & All Saints', on their merger in December 2002.  Following a further merger in September 2007, it became one of three parish churches within the parish of All Saints', St. Mary's and St. Peter's, Nottingham.  The building itself is a large example of Victorian church architecture.

A map of the parish is available on Google Maps.

History 

The church was built in 1863–64, mainly in sandstone. Along with the church, a large parsonage and a church school were built at the sole cost (some £10,000) (equivalent to £ in ), of William Windley JP, a local philanthropist. With all of the ancillary building, the total cost was £25,000 (equivalent to £ in ).

The architect was Thomas Chambers Hine, of Nottingham.

The church was consecrated on 3 November 1864. 1200 crammed into the 800 seats and there was a large attendance of clergy. The choir of St. Mary's Church were accompanied by Miss Fanny Brookes on the harmonium. The Rt. Revd. John Jackson, Bishop of Lincoln, performed the consecration service in the presence of the new pastor, Joshua William Brooks.

At the time of its construction, All Saints' Parish was a new wealthy suburb outside the old city boundary of Nottingham on an area previously known as Sandfield. The expansion had been as a result of the 1830s cholera epidemic. With the continued expansion of the City of Nottingham, the parish became an inner-city area of Nottingham which suffered significant decline after the Second World War. By the 1980s it was designated an Urban Priority Area and the congregation declined to around 30–40 at the turn of the millennium.

The old school building, which had fallen out of use in the 1920s, was converted into small workspaces, and half of the original huge vicarage was converted into residences of young single people in the early 1980s. More recently in 2006, following protracted negotiations, the New Deal for Radford bought the old School to refurbish it for use by local organisations.

The church and many of the other buildings are now Grade II listed. It continues to be in use for regular Sunday morning services. Given the small congregation, discussions are underway as to whether there may be other joint uses of the space available.

List of incumbents
Edwin Gyles 1864-1880
Alfred Pearson 1880-1888 (afterwards vicar of St. Margaret's Church, Brighton)
Hubert Arnold Gem 1888-1902 (afterwards vicar of St Mary's Church, Wirksworth)
Thomas Wilson Windley 1902-1912
Herbert Lovell Clarke 1912-1923 (afterwards vicar of St Bartholomew's Church, Armley)
W.H.M. Lonsdale 1923-1929
C.H. Weller 1929-1937
Edward Frederick H Dunnicliffe 1937-1946 (afterwards vicar of St. Helen's Church, Selston)
T.W. Richardson 1946-1950
Charles W. Harrington 1950-1955
John N.D. Perkins 1955-1979
Paul George Watts 1980-1984
Nigel Peyton 1985-1991
David White 1992-1998
Gilly Myers (priest-in-charge) 2000-2002

Bells
The six bells were cast by John Taylor & Co of Loughborough on an oak bell frame. At installation in 1864 this was extended to accommodate two extra bells. The bells were tuned in the key of E, the heaviest weighing 17cwt.

In 1999 the bells were tuned and hung in a new steel frame with room for 10 bells. At the same time the redundant All Saints’ School bell was installed as a Sanctus bell. The Nottingham University Society of Change Ringers use the church for practice and also ring the bells for church services.

On 19 May 2019 the bells stopped ringing due to health and safety concerns. Damage to the spire had allowed for pigeons to enter the bell tower and nest. The damage was mainly to the floor above the bells, which had become rotten due to the large volumes of guano. 

The project to restore the tower was taken on by the Nottingham University Society of Change Ringers, with the support of the Church. It consisted of a complete clean of the tower, removing approximately 2.2 tons of bird waste. It also saw the dismantling of the old floor, and construction of a new floor above the bells. This new floor serves as a load bearing platform in case of any future work which may be needed on the spire, and acts as a form of control for the bells. Finally it involved a total renovation of the ringing chamber. 

On 8 February 2020 the bells were first heard again, during a test ring, then the bells were officially handed back to the Nottingham University Society of Change Ringers for ringing on 11 February 2020.

Organ
The first organ was built by Lloyd and Dudgeon from Nottingham and was opened on 6 July 1865.

The current organ is by Norman and Beard and dates from 1906.

List of organists

George Essex 1865 - 1883
G. H. Woodhouse 1883 - 1899 (formerly organist of St Paul's Church, George Street, Nottingham)
Arthur Richards 1899 - 1915
Frederick William Hughes 1915 - 1918 (formerly organist of Horncastle Parish Church)
Frederick George Ainsworth Wyatt 1918 - 1947 (formerly of St. Thomas' Church, Nottingham)
Eric Rayner 1947 - 1972
Peter C Price 1973 - 1977
Malcolm Batchelor
Jean Bruce
Peter Moule
Nowadays, there is no regular organist; a team of organists are shared between St Peter's and All Saints, headed by the Director of Music, Peter Siepmann.

See also 
Nottingham University Society of Change Ringers
St. Mary's Church, Nottingham
St. Peter's Church, Nottingham

References

External links 
Parish website
See All Saints' Church on Google Street View.

Churches completed in 1864
19th-century Church of England church buildings
Churches in Nottingham
Nottingham
Nottingham
Gothic Revival church buildings in England
Gothic Revival architecture in Nottinghamshire
Thomas Chambers Hine buildings